Gjemnes is a municipality in Møre og Romsdal county, Norway on the Romsdal peninsula. It is part of the Nordmøre region. The administrative centre is the village of Batnfjordsøra, which lies along the Batnfjorden and it is a former steamship landing place. Other villages in Gjemnes include Torvikbukt, Flemma, Angvika, Gjemnes, Øre, and Osmarka.

The  municipality is the 243rd largest by area out of the 356 municipalities in Norway. Gjemnes is the 243rd most populous municipality in Norway with a population of 2,669.

General information
The municipality of Gjemnes was established on 1 September 1893 when the southern part of Kvernes Municipality (population: 477), the northern part of Øre Municipality (population: 226), and the southwestern part of Frei Municipality (population: 231) were merged. The initial population of the municipality was 934. During the 1960s, there were many municipal mergers across Norway due to the work of the Schei Committee. On 1 January 1965, Øre Municipality (population: 1,565) and all of Tingvoll Municipality located west of the Tingvollfjorden (population: 778) were merged with Gjemnes Municipality (population: 697) to form a new, larger municipality of Gjemnes.

Name
The municipality is named after the old Gjemnes farm, since Gjemnes Church was built there in 1893. The meaning of the first element is probably an old river name, the last element is nes which means "headland".

Coat of arms
The coat of arms was granted on 4 November 1983. The arms show the head of a Red Deer on a green background. The green symbolizes the agricultural history of the community. The deer antlers have twelve points on it representing the twelve districts of Gjemnes.

Churches
The Church of Norway has two parishes within the municipality of Gjemnes. It is part of the Indre Nordmøre prosti (deanery) in the Diocese of Møre.

Geography

The municipality lies along the Kvernesfjorden, Batnfjorden, Freifjorden, and Tingvollfjorden. The mountain Reinsfjellet (highest in the municipality) lies near Torvikbukt. The municipality also includes the island of Bergsøya which is located at the junction of the fjords near the village of Gjemnes.

Gjemnes is surrounded by Kristiansund Municipality and Averøy Municipality to the north; Eide, Fræna, and Molde municipalities to the west; Nesset Municipality to the south; and Tingvoll Municipality to the east.

Government
All municipalities in Norway, including Gjemnes, are responsible for primary education (through 10th grade), outpatient health services, senior citizen services, unemployment and other social services, zoning, economic development, and municipal roads. The municipality is governed by a municipal council of elected representatives, which in turn elect a mayor. The municipality falls under the Møre og Romsdal District Court and the Frostating Court of Appeal.

Municipal council
The municipal council of Gjemnes is made up of 17 representatives that are elected to four year terms. The party breakdown of the council is as follows:

Mayor
The mayors of Gjemnes (incomplete list):
2015–present: Knut Sjømæling (Sp)
2011-2015: Odd Steinar Bjerkeset (KrF)
2007-2011: Knut Sjømæling (Sp)
1999-2007: Odd Steinar Bjerkeset (KrF)

Transport
European Route E39 runs through the municipality and over the Gjemnessund Bridge and Bergsøysund Bridge connecting Gjemnes to Tingvoll Municipality. The Freifjord Tunnel (part of Norwegian National Road 70) runs from Bergsøya to the nearby island of Frei (and ultimately Kristiansund).

Notable people 
 John Neergaard (1795–1885) a Norwegian farmer and bailiff (lensmann) in Gjemnes 1836 to 1854
 Anton Berge (1892 in Gjemnes – 1951) a Norwegian agronomist and local politician

References

External links
Municipal fact sheet from Statistics Norway 
Official website 

 
Nordmøre
Municipalities of Møre og Romsdal
1893 establishments in Norway